NRV may stand for:

 Nederlandse Rijnvaart Vereeniging, a Dutch Rhine shipping company
 Net realizable value of an asset
 Norddeutscher Regatta Verein, a German yacht club
 Not Really Vanished, computer compression algorithm in UPX
 Valmet Nr I and Valmet Nr II Helsinki trams
 Non Return Valve (check Valve)